The Guinea Hog is an American breed of small black pig. Since 2006 it has officially been named the American Guinea Hog. Its origins are unknown; a connection to the Essex pigs of eastern England has been suggested. It is apparently unconnected to an older pig also known as Guinea Hog or Red Guinea, which disappeared in the late nineteenth century.

The American Guinea Hog is a rare breed with a black coat, sturdy body, curly tail and upright ears.

There are two types of Guinea hog in North America, small-boned and large-boned Guinea hogs, the latter having longer legs. There is also a type of Guinea hog in South America.

History
The name derives from the belief that the origins of the Guinea hog were from African Guinea, but its now thought that Guinea just implied small, like Guinea Cattle. Guinea Hogs and Guinea Cattle are both smaller breeds of domestic livestock. The true African Guinea hogs are a large, red breed with upright ears, bristly hair and long tails, suggesting genetic influence of the Nigerian black or Ashanti pig.  They were brought to America on slave ships.  Around 1804, Thomas Jefferson  acquired some of these pigs, which had arrived from Africa via the Canary Isles.  The original strain, although basically black, also had a hint of red and were consequently called "red Guineas"; that strain, well known at the beginning of the 19th century, is extinct.

This breed, the American Guinea hog retained its black colour but lost the red tint and is sometimes called a black Guinea.  These pigs were popular with subsistence farmers, not only through their ability to forage for themselves, but also because their habit of eating snakes made the farmyard safe for children and livestock.

The breed fell out of favour after around 1880, and for a while was in danger of being entirely lost.  The red Guinea no longer exists and its exact relationship with the American Guinea and what proportions of other breeds are in its background are not known for certain.  However, that there is a relationship is shown by the occasional birth of a reddish pig to the normally bluish-black American Guinea parents.  It is suspected that there were a number of distinct American Guineas in the past.  In 2005 the American Guinea Hog Association was formed which works to ensure its continued existence. The Guinea hog is also included in Slow Food USA's Ark of Taste, a catalog of heritage foods in danger of extinction.

The Chicago Lincoln Park Zoo for a number of years was home to several guinea hogs.

Guinea Hogs as pets
Guinea Hogs are one of many smaller breeds that are known to be kept as pets, though not as popular as the Potbelly pig or the Kunekune pig.

References

Bibliography
R. A. Donkin, "The peccary: with observations on the introduction of pigs to the New World", Transactions of the American Philosophical Society, American Philosophical Society, 1985 .
W. G. Kirk, "Swine production in the southeast", Journal of Animal Science, 1936b, pp. 103–106, American Society of Animal Science 1936.
Gary Paul Nabhan, Deborah Madison, Makale Faber, Ashley Rood, Renewing America's Food Traditions: Saving and Savoring the Continent's Most Endangered Foods, Chelsea Green Publishing, 2008 .

Pig breeds originating in the United States